The local government areas (LGAs) of Queensland, Australia are the defined areas within which legally constituted local government authorities, known as councils, have responsibilities to provide local services. Determining the size and shape of the local government areas is the sole responsibility of the Queensland Government.

In the past, many local government areas (especially in South East Queensland and the Darling Downs region) have been amalgamated or abolished, either voluntarily or involuntarily. The most significant of these processes took place in March 2008, when 97 local government areas and 20 indigenous councils were amalgamated under a statewide reform process — until this time, the majority of Queensland's local government areas had remained unchanged for decades and some even dated back to the establishment of local government for regional areas in 1879.

Local government de-amalgamations in 2014 
In 2014, after referendums were held,  4 previously amalgamated Shires were de-amalgamated.

 The Shire of Douglas separated from Cairns Region
 The Shire of Mareeba separated from Tablelands Region 
 The Shire of Livingstone separated from Rockhampton Region
 The Shire of Noosa separated from Sunshine Coast Region

The Resulting List of councils and their Number Code

Local government areas amalgamated in 2008
In April 2007, an extensive Local Government Reform process was set up by the Beattie Government, who set up a Local Government Reform Commission to report on the State's local government areas other than the City of Brisbane. This was in part due to the number of financially weak councils with small populations in rural areas, dating from an earlier time when industry and population had justified their creation. The Commission reported back on 27 July 2007, recommending massive amalgamations all over the State into "regional councils" centred on major towns or centres, based on a range of criteria such as economy of scale, community of interest and financial sustainability. On 10 August 2007, the Commission's amalgamation recommendations passed into law as the Local Government (Reform Implementation) Act 2007, with only a few name changes as alterations. "Local Transition Committees" (LTCs) were created for each new area, made up of councillors and staff from the original areas, and on 15 March 2008, the old entities formally ceased to exist and elections were held to fill the new councils.

Local government areas amalgamated in the 1990s

Amalgamations in 1948-9

In 1948, the Queensland Government proposed three sets of LGA amalgamations: south of Brisbane, around Ipswich and around Toowoomba.

South Coast
On 9 December 1948, as part of a major reorganisation of local government in South East Queensland, an Order in Council replacing ten former local government areas between the City of Brisbane and the New South Wales border with only four. The Order came into effect on 10 June 1949, when the first elections were held.

Amalgamations into Greater Brisbane in 1925

Other former local government areas

See also
 Local government areas of Queensland
 List of divisional boards in Queensland

References